The 2021–22 Illinois State Redbirds men's basketball team represented Illinois State University during the 2021–22 NCAA Division I men's basketball season. The Redbirds played their home games at Doug Collins Court at Redbird Arena in Normal, Illinois as members of the Missouri Valley Conference. The team finished the season 13–20, 5–13 in MVC play to finish in eighth place. They defeated Indiana State in the first round of the MVC tournament before losing to Northern Iowa in the quarterfinals.

Head coach Dan Muller was fired by the school after the first 26 games of the season after 10 years as head coach, but the school stated he would finish out the season A day later, Muller announced he would step down immediately and associate head coach Brian Jones was named interim coach for the remainder of the season. On March 7, 2022, the school named Ohio State assistant coach Ryan Pedon as the team's new head coach.

Previous season 
In a season limited due to the ongoing COVID-19 pandemic, the Redbirds finished the 2020–21 season 7–18, 4–14 in MVC play to finish in 10th place. In the MVC tournament, they lost to Northern Iowa in the first round.

Offseason

Departures

2021 recruiting class

Incoming transfers

Roster

Schedule and results

|-
!colspan=9 style=|Exhibition

|-
!colspan=9 style=|Regular season

|-
!colspan=9 style=|MVC Tournament

Source

References

Illinois State Redbirds
Illinois State Redbirds men's basketball seasons
Illinois State Redbirds men's basketball
Illinois State Redbirds men's basketball